The family Zygaenidae comprises the "forester and burnet moths", only species of the tribe Artonini (subfamily Procridinae) are found in Australia. This list acts as an index to the species articles and forms part of the full List of moths of Australia.

Australartona mirabilis Tarmann, 2005
Hestiochora continentalis Tarmann, 2005
Hestiochora erythrota Meyrick, 1886
Hestiochora furcata Tarmann, 2005
Hestiochora intermixta Tarmann, 2005
Hestiochora occidentalis Tarmann, 2005
Hestiochora queenslandensis Tarmann, 2005
Hestiochora tricolor (Walker, 1854)
Hestiochora xanthocoma Meyrick, 1886
Homophylotis artonoides Tarmann, 2005
Homophylotis pseudothyridota Tarmann, 2005
Homophylotis thyridota Turner, 1904
Myrtartona coronias (Meyrick, 1886)
Myrtartona leucopleura (Meyrick, 1886)
Myrtartona mariannae Tarmann, 2005
Myrtartona rufiventris (Walker, 1854)
Onceropyga anelia Turner, 1906
Onceropyga pulchra Tarmann, 2005
Palmartona catoxantha (Hampson, 1893)
Pollanisus acharon (Fabricius, 1775)
Pollanisus angustifrons Tarmann, 2005
Pollanisus apicalis (Walker, 1854)
Pollanisus calliceros Turner, 1926
Pollanisus commoni Tarmann, 2005
Pollanisus contrastus Tarmann, 2005
Pollanisus cupreus Walker, 1854
Pollanisus cyanota (Meyrick, 1886)
Pollanisus edwardsi Tarmann, 2005
Pollanisus empyrea (Meyrick, 1888)
Pollanisus eumetopus Turner, 1926
Pollanisus eungellae Tarmann, 2005
Pollanisus incertus Tarmann, 2005
Pollanisus isolatus Tarmann, 2005
Pollanisus lithopastus Turner, 1926
Pollanisus modestus Tarmann, 2005
Pollanisus nielseni Tarmann, 2005
Pollanisus subdolosa (Walker, 1865)
Pollanisus trimacula (Walker, 1854)
Pollanisus viridipulverulenta (Guérin-Méneville, 1839)
Pseudoamuria neglecta Tarmann, 2005
Pseudoamuria uptoni Tarmann, 2005
Thyrassia inconcinna Swinhoe, 1892
Turneriprocris dolens (Walker, 1854)

External links 
Zygaenidae at the Australian Faunal Directory
Zygaenidae at butterflyhouse.com.au

Australia